Aya Medel (born November 5, 1980) is a Filipina former actress, chef, and restaurateur. She was dubbed as the "Papaya Queen" in the 1990s.

Career 
At age 14, Medel was spotted by a modeling agent after she became first runner-up in Mutya ng Tabaco in Albay. She went from modeling to acting in erotic films such as Asong Ulol, Totoy Mola, Molata, Babae sa Bubungang Lata, Padre Kalibre, and Sisa. Medel also starred in foreign films such as Naked Nights, Love and Desire Troublesome Nights (a comedy film shown in Hong Kong), and Total Aikido (a film shown in Japan). During her showbiz stint, Medel also became a television host for the anthology drama, Daisy Siete, and the longest noontime variety show, Eat Bulaga.

Medel has left her showbiz career to become a chef. She now owns several restaurants.

Personal life 
When Medel quit her acting career in 2002, she married Yoji Hayakawa, a Japanese businessman with whom she has two children. They divorced. Medel studied to become a chef at the Center of Asian Culinary School and started a restaurant business in Tabaco, Albay.

Filmography

Film

Television

References

External links 

 

1980 births
Filipino film actresses
Filipino television actresses
Filipino restaurateurs
Filipino women in business
Living people
People from Albay